Eunice Anderson is an American actress who has appeared in a number of films and episodes of television shows, as well as on stage. She received credit for appearing in the films Jeremy (1973), A League of Their Own (1992), The Narrows (2008), and Falling Awake (2009), as well as the made-for-television film Concealed Enemies (1984).

From 1960 to 1963 she lived in Europe and played theatre and film parts there.  On stage, she was on Broadway as part of the cast of The Great Indoors in 1966 and Herzl in 1976.  Off Broadway appearances have included Maids and The Three Sisters, among others.  She appeared in The Chalk Garden in 1981.  She also had a successful two-year run playing the role of Millie in The Hot l Baltimore at the Circle in the Square Theatre in Greenwich Village.

Her most recent television appearance was the "Country Drive" episode (2011) of Louie, where she portrayed the bigoted elderly great-aunt of the eponymous show's central character. Her performance was well received.  Other appearances include Naked City,  the "Bound" episode (2004) of Law & Order: Special Victims Unit and the "Old People Creep Me Out" episode (2010) of the short-lived Gravity.

References

External links

Hollywood.com

Living people
American film actresses
21st-century American actresses
Year of birth missing (living people)